Steven K. Conine (born 1972/73) is an American businessman, and the co-chairman and co-founder (with Niraj Shah) of the online retailer Wayfair.

Early life
Raised in the New Vernon section of Harding Township, New Jersey, Conine spent some time during his teens working at a pair of outdoor furniture stores his mother operated. Conine graduated from Delbarton School in 1991. He went on to attend Cornell University, where he earned a bachelor's degree in mechanical engineering in 1995.

Career
Conine co-founded Wayfair in 2002, and is the co-chairman of the board.

In May 2017, Wayfair's share price rose above $70 per share, making Conine and his co-founder Niraj Shah both  billionaires. As of 2019, each had an estimated net worth of $2.3 billion.

Personal life
Conine is married to Alexi, they have three children and live in Boston, Massachusetts. They have a holiday home in Jackson Hole, Wyoming.

References

Living people
Cornell University alumni
American company founders
American billionaires
1970s births
People from Boston
People from Harding Township, New Jersey
Delbarton School alumni